Last Sessions is an album by Mississippi John Hurt. It was recorded at a Manhattan hotel in February and July 1966 shortly before Hurt's death that year, and released in 1972 by Vanguard Records.

Critical reception 

Reviewing Last Sessions in Christgau's Record Guide: Rock Albums of the Seventies (1981), Robert Christgau wrote:

The record was later regarded by Christgau as "one of those nearness-of-death albums", along with Bob Dylan's Time Out of Mind (1997), Warren Zevon's The Wind (2003), Neil Young's Prairie Wind (2005), and Johnny Cash's American VI: Ain't No Grave (2010). In The New Rolling Stone Record Guide (1983), Dave Marsh reviewed Last Sessions within the context of Hurt's late-period music; while he had "lost some technical ability due to age" and "wheezes and rattles, clearly on his last legs", the album "does not surrender his marvelous spirit".

Track listing

References

External links 
 

1972 compilation albums
Mississippi John Hurt albums
Vanguard Records compilation albums